ICC U19 Cricket World Cup Africa Qualifier (formerly ICC Africa Under-19 Championships) are a series of regular cricket tournaments organised by the International Cricket Council (ICC) for under-19 teams from its African member nations. It is the regional qualifier for the ICC Under-19 World Cup.

The initial tournament was staged in 2001 but did not return until 2007. During the interim years a joint competition with the East Asia-Pacific Cricket Council was held. A second division was added in 2009 providing affiliate nations with a chance to participate. After this first edition, two teams were promoted, but since then only one team has moved between divisions. The two divisions are played at different times and in different locations.

The current champions are Uganda, who won the 2021 tournament in Rwanda to qualify for the 2022 Under-19 Cricket World Cup in the West Indies. Namibia have won six titles, the most of any team, while Uganda have won twice and Kenya and Nigeria once each.

Under-19 World Cup Qualification History

One of the key aspects of the African Under-19 Championships is its role in Under-19 World Cup Qualification. Before the introduction of the championship only Kenya and Namibia took part in the World Cup. However, aided by the development of international cricket during the late 90s and 2000s the possibility of holding the first African regional qualifier arose in 2001. Of the five associate nations at that time, Kenya already had automatic qualification for the 2002 U-19 World Cup due to their ODI status. As a result, the highest finisher in the inaugural competition besides Kenya would also qualify. Namibia finished in first place and so earned themselves the final World Cup space.

For the following two U-19 World Cups, the African Cricket Association and the East Asia-Pacific Cricket Council organised joint qualification competitions from which two teams would progress. In the 2003 competition, Uganda qualified alongside EAP side Papua New Guinea for the 2004 U-19 World Cup but in 2005 two African nations, Namibia and Uganda made it through to the 2006 finals.

In 2007, the two councils once again organised separate competitions, meaning only one team would qualify from the African Championships. Namibia beat Kenya in the final to go through as the representative of African associate nations.

The entire qualification system for the U-19 World Cup was revamped in 2009. Whilst regionally, a second division of African affiliate nations was organised, including the chance of promotion, a new international qualification tournament was introduced by the ICC. This competition saw ten teams, two from each of the five cricketing regions, fighting for the six remaining places in the World Cup finals. The winners and runners-up of the 2009 Africa U-19 Championships, Uganda and Sierra Leone, made it through to the U-19 World Qualifiers, but neither finished high enough to progress to final. The Sierra Leone team hit the headlines when they were denied visas and so had no chance to compete.

The same system continued for the 2012 U-19 World Cup qualification, though the regional divisions were played a year earlier than usual, in 2010. Namibia and Kenya finished first and second in Division One earning them places in the U-19 World Cup Qualifier, held the next year.

Tournament results

Division One

Division Two

Participating teams (Division One)
Legend
 – Champions
 – Runners-up
 – Third place
Q – Qualified
 * – Combined tournament with EAP members (not included in this table)
 – Hosts

Records
This section includes performances by African teams and players at the 2003 and 2005 combined Africa/EAP tournaments.
Highest team scores
 399/5 (50 overs) –  vs , 29 August 2007, at Willowmoore Park, Benoni.
 356/9 (50 overs) –  vs , 4 October 2003, at Police Sports Club, Windhoek.
 355/8 (50 overs) –  vs West Africa, 5 January 2001, at Lugogo Stadium, Kampala.
 334/7 (50 overs) –  vs , 27 May 2013, at Kyambogo Cricket Oval, Kampala.
 321/6 (50 overs) –  vs , 16 February 2015, at Annadil Burhani Ground, Dar es Salaam.

Lowest team scores
 21 all out (18.4 overs) –  vs , 26 August 2007, at Willowmoore Park, Benoni.
 35/8 (20 overs) –  vs , 4 May 2009, Centrals Sports Club, Lusaka.
 36 all out (15 overs) –  vs , 5 September 2010, at Centre for Cricket Development, Windhoek.
 41 all out (12.2 overs) –  vs , 28 May 2013, at Lugogo Stadium, Kampala.
 42 all out (18.1 overs) –  vs , 25 August 2007, at Willowmoore Park, Benoni.

Highest individual scores
 161 (143 balls) –  Xander Pitchers, vs , 27 May 2013, at Kyambogo Cricket Oval, Kampala.
 155* (129 balls) –  Zane Green, vs , 16 February 2015, at Annadil Burhani Ground, Dar es Salaam.
 152 (130 balls) –  Gert Lotter, vs , 31 August 2010, at Afrikaans Primary School, Windhoek.
 135 (? balls) –  Laurence Sematimba, vs West Africa, 5 January 2001, at Lugogo Stadium, Kampala.
 127 (? balls) –  Hafeez Manji, vs , 4 October 2003, at Police Sports Club, Windhoek.

Best bowling figures
 7/11 (8 overs) –  David Wabwire, vs , 14 February 2015, at Annadil Burhani Ground, Dar es Salaam.
 7/12 (6.1 overs) –  Athumani Kakonzi, vs , 23 August 2005, at Willowmoore Park, Benoni.
 7/14 (10 overs) –  Collins Okwalinga, vs , 19 February 2015, at Gymkhana Club Ground, Dar es Salaam.
 6/3 (9.4 overs) –  Charles Waiswa, vs , 26 August 2007, at Willowmoore Park, Benoni.
 6/7 (8 overs) –  Geoffrey Nyero vs , 4 May 2009, Centrals Sports Club, Lusaka.

See also
 ICC Africa Twenty20 Championship
 ICC Africa Women's Championship
 World Cricket League Africa Region

Notes

References

Under-19 regional cricket tournaments
African championships
Cricket in Africa